The Men's 50 Butterfly event at the 10th FINA World Aquatics Championships swam July 20–21, 2003 in Barcelona, Spain. Preliminary and Semifinal heats swam on 20 July, with the Final swum on 21 July.

At the start of the event, the existing World (WR) and Championship (CR) records were both:
WR & CR: 23.44 swum by Geoff Huegill (Australia) on July 27, 2001 in Fukuoka, Japan

Results

Final

Semifinals

Preliminaries

References

Swimming at the 2003 World Aquatics Championships